Lone Star Camp is a hunting and working ranch camp in Tilden, Texas, owned by the Franklin Family.

History
After almost 100 years in the business, the Texas Historical Commission has awarded Lone Star Camp a Texas historical Marker. It has a vast population of native whitetail deer, bobwhite and blue quail, Rio Grande wild turkey, javelina, and feral hogs, as well as hundreds of resident and migrant birds.

External links
Lone Star Camp - Official Site

Buildings and structures in McMullen County, Texas